Gracixalus ananjevae, the Ananjeva Asian treefrog, is a species of frog in the family Rhacophoridae.

It is endemic to Vietnam. Its natural habitats are subtropical or tropical moist montane forests and intermittent freshwater marshes. It is threatened by habitat loss.

References

ananjevae
Endemic fauna of Vietnam
Amphibians of Vietnam
Amphibians described in 2004
Taxonomy articles created by Polbot